Paulette Jiles (aka Paulette K. Jiles, Paulette Jiles-Johnson) (born 4 April 1943) is an American poet, memoirist, and novelist.

Personal life 
Paulette Kay Jiles was born in 1943 in Salem, Missouri. She attended college at the University of Missouri–Kansas City, graduating in 1968 with a major in Romance Languages. Jiles moved to Toronto, Canada in 1969, where she worked for the Canadian Broadcasting Corporation and, subsequently, helped set up native language, FM radio stations with indigenous peoples in the far north of Ontario and Quebec for the next 10 years. In the process, she learned the Ojibwe language
spoken by the Anishinaabeg peoples in Ontario and elsewhere.

After marrying Jim Johnson, she moved with him to San Antonio in 1991. After several years of travel, including living in Mexico, the couple resettled in San Antonio in 1995, buying a house in the historical district.  Since her divorce in 2003, Jiles has lived on a 36-acre ranch near Utopia, Texas, about 80 miles west of San Antonio.

Writing career 

Her 2016 novel News of the World was a finalist for the National Book Award for Fiction.

Selected bibliography

 Waterloo Express (1973)
 Celestial Navigation (1984, winner of the 1984 Governor General's Award for English Poetry, the Pat Lowther Award, and the Gerald Lampert Award)
 The Golden Hawks (Where We Live) (1985)
 Sitting in the Club Car Drinking Rum and Karma Kola (1986, nominated for the Ethel Wilson Fiction Prize)
 The Late Great Human Road Show (1986, nominated for the Books in Canada First Novel Award)
 The Jesse James Poems (1988)
 Blackwater (1988)
 Song to the Rising Sun (1989)
 Cousins (1992)
 Flying Lesson: Selected Poems (1995)
 North Spirit: Sojourns Among the Cree and Ojibway Nations and Their Star Maps (1995)
 Enemy Women (2002, winner of the Rogers Writers' Trust Fiction Prize)
 Stormy Weather (2007)
 The Color of Lightning (2009)
 Lighthouse Island (2013)
 News of the World (2016)
 Simon the Fiddler (2020)

References

External links
Her blog is Paulette Jiles, Author. <accessdate=7 October 2017>

American women poets
American women novelists
Novelists from Missouri
University of Illinois Urbana-Champaign alumni
People from Salem, Missouri
1943 births
Living people
Governor General's Award-winning poets
20th-century American novelists
21st-century American novelists
20th-century American poets
21st-century American poets
20th-century American women writers
21st-century American women writers
Poets from Missouri